Rıdvan Turan (born 1 January 1971) is a Turkish politician from the Peoples' Democratic Party (HDP), who serves as a Member of Parliament for Mersin.

Born in Reşadiye, Tokat, Turan graduated from Uludağ University Faculty of Medicine in 1995. In 2008, he was elected as the leader of the Socialist Democracy Party, which was a member of the Peoples' Democratic Congress and was thus instrumental in the establishment of the Peoples' Democratic Party (HDP) in 2012. In Jul 2013 he was convicted to 6 years and 3 months imprisonment being a member of an illegal organization. The sentence was appealed. He was elected Member of Parliament for the HDP in the June 2015 general election but lost his seat in the snap election held on 1 November 2015.

He regained a seat in the 2018 parliamentary election representing Mersin.

See also
25th Parliament of Turkey

References

External links
 Collection of all relevant news items at Haberler.com
 Collection of all relevant news items at Son Dakika

Peoples' Democratic Party (Turkey) politicians
Deputies of Adana
Members of the 25th Parliament of Turkey
Living people
People from Tokat
1971 births
Members of the 27th Parliament of Turkey